The Embassy of India in Kyiv is a diplomatic mission of the Republic of India to Ukraine. Shri Harsh Kumar Jain is the current Ambassador of India to Ukraine. Embassy serves Ukraine region. 

The embassy was closed on 1 March 2022 due to the 2022 Russian invasion of Ukraine and staff were initially relocated to Lviv and then to Warsaw, Poland. The embassy reopened on 17 May 2022.

Education
Scholarships are offered by the embassy to local nationals to study in India.

See also
 India–Ukraine relations
 Foreign relations of India
 Foreign relations of Ukraine
 List of diplomatic missions of India
 List of diplomatic missions in Ukraine

References

External links

Ukraine
India
India–Ukraine relations